The EG LNG Pipeline Suspension Bridge is a suspension bridge in Bioko, Equatorial Guinea. It is the first in the world to carry a Liquefied Natural Gas pipeline.

References

Bridges in Equatorial Guinea
Suspension bridges